The Honourable Granville Dudley Ryder JP (26 November 1799 – 24 November 1879), was a British Tory politician.

Ryder was the second son of Dudley Ryder, 1st Earl of Harrowby, and his wife, the former Lady Susanna Leveson-Gower, daughter of Granville Leveson-Gower, 1st Marquess of Stafford. A graduate of Trinity College, Cambridge, he served in the Royal Navy and achieved the rank of Lieutenant. He later sat as Member of Parliament for Tiverton from 1830 to 1832 and for Hertfordshire from 1841 to 1847. He also served as a Justice of the Peace for Hertfordshire.

Ryder married his first cousin, Lady Georgiana Augusta, daughter of Henry Somerset, 6th Duke of Beaufort, in 1825. They had seven daughters and six sons. Their eldest son, Dudley Henry Ryder, was an ancestor of the 20th-century soldier and politician Robert Ryder. Their second son, Granville Ryder, was a politician. A younger son, Henry Stuart Ryder, was a junior officer in the Rifle Brigade and was killed at the Battle of the Great Redan in 1855.

Lady Georgiana Ryder died in March 1865. Ryder survived her by fourteen years and died in November 1879, two days before his eightieth birthday.

Family
The Hon. Granville Dudley Ryder married Lady Georgiana Augusta Somerset, daughter of Henry Somerset, 6th Duke of Beaufort, on 30 May 1825 and had 13 children.

Georgiana Susan Ryder, b. 10 June 1826, d. 27 June 1826
Susan Georgiana Ryder, b. 7 July 1827, d. 31 January 1901, married Colonel Sir Philip Charles William FitzRoy James of Tarrant, Dorset, son of Lt Col Sir William James and Caroline Gordon (granddaughter of John Gordon, 3rd Earl of Aboyne) on 3 August 1844, they had three children
Canon Mark James, b. October 1845, d. 16 May 1898, married Caroline Ethel Gertrude Stewart, daughter of Admiral Hon. Keith Stewart (son of George Stewart, 8th Earl of Galloway) and Mary Caroline Fitzroy (daughter of Sir Charles FitzRoy), had issue.
Major William Charles James, b. 1851, married Hon. Mary-Theresa Digby, daughter of Edward Digby, 9th Baron Digby
Martha Ellen James, b. 1856, d. 14 January 1936, married Andrew Spens of Craigsanquhar, son of Major-General Andrew Spens
Dudley Henry Ryder, b. 7 February 1830, d. 8 September 1911, married Georgiana Emily Calcroft, daughter of John Hales Calcraft on 1 December 1857, they had nine children
Katherine Susan Ryder, d. 24 March 1922
Evelyn Georgiana Ryder, d. 1940
Caroline Katharine Ryder, d. 14 February 1933, married Robert Armitage
Lt.-Col. Dudley Granville Richard Ryder, b. 30 September 1858, d. 27 June 1926, married Ada Carr Glyn, daughter of Lt.-Gen. Sir John Plumptre Carr Glyn
Cyril John Ryder, b. 8 July 1863, d. 28 December 1907, married Lady Isobel Hamilton, daughter of Captain Charles Hamilton, sister of Alfred Douglas-Hamilton, 13th Duke of Hamilton, had issue
William Henry Dudley Ryder,  b. 7 January 1865, d. 24 February 1933, married, firstly, Catherine Sutton, daughter of Reverend Augustus Sutton, married, secondly, Florence Campbell, daughter of Captain Frederick Campbell, son of Maj.-Gen. Sir Guy Campbell, 1st Bt., had issue by both wives
Charles Edward Henry Ryder, b. 17 September 1868, d. 6 October 1900
Cosmo Alan Cuthbert Ryder, b. 29 August 1870, d. 20 May 1917
Rev. John Claud Dudley Ryder, b. 24 September 1873, d. 1 June 1900
Granville Ryder, b. 22 September 1833, d. 3 August 1901, married Sybilla Sophia Grant, daughter of Sir Robert Grant on 19 March 1864, died without issue.
Charlotte Mary Ryder, b. 8 October 1831
Granville Richard Ryder, b. 22 September 1833
Henry Stuart Ryder, b. 10 February 1835, d. 8 September 1855, died in action and unmarried.
Francis Edward Ryder, b. 24 October 1836
Georgiana Henrietta Frederica Ryder, b. 24 August 1841 (twin)
Augusta Louisa Ryder, b. 24 August 1841 (twin)
Isabella Sophia Ann Ryder, b. 19 June 1841,  married  1868 William Moore, son of Mr. Justice Richard Moore, d.1884
A daughter, b. 3 September 1843, d. 1 November 1843
A son, b. 13 September 1844

Ancestry

See also

References

External links 
 

1799 births
1879 deaths
Younger sons of earls
Members of the Parliament of the United Kingdom for Hertfordshire
UK MPs 1830–1831
UK MPs 1831–1832
UK MPs 1841–1847
Granville